The Azores chaffinch (Fringilla coelebs moreletti) is a small passerine bird in the finch family Fringillidae. It is a subspecies of the common chaffinch that is endemic to the Portuguese archipelago of the Azores, part of Macaronesia in the North Atlantic Ocean. It is locally known as the tentilhão or sachão.

Description
The head and part of the dorsum are bluish gray, with the rest of the dorsal area being greenish; the wings and tail are black and white; the throat and chest are pink. The bill is lead-colored. The paws are pinkish brown. The plumage of the females is more discreet, dominating the brown tones.

Distribution and habitat
The Azores chaffinch inhabits all of the Azorean Islands and is one the most common birds in the archipelago, It can be seen from sea-level to the mountainous interior, including the highest areas of Pico.

References

Birds described in 1859
Birds of the Azores
Endemic fauna of the Azores
Fringilla